The 1989 Volvo Tennis San Francisco, also known as the Pacific Coast Championships, was a men's tennis tournament played on indoor carpet courts at the Cow Palace in San Francisco, California in the United States. The event was part of the Super Series of the 1989 Nabisco Grand Prix circuit. The 100-year anniversary of the inaugural event was the 101st edition of the tournament and was held from September 25 through October 1, 1989. Third-seeded Brad Gilbert won the singles title and earned $59,500 first-prize money.

Finals

Singles

 Brad Gilbert defeated  Anders Järryd 7–5, 6–2
 It was Gilbert's 5th singles title of the year and the 17th of his career.

Doubles

 Pieter Aldrich /  Danie Visser defeated  Paul Annacone /  Christo van Rensburg 6–4, 6–3

References